Dil Bhusan Pathak Editor-in-Chief of Kantipur Television (2015-2018, 2021 to present) has three decades in his career of journalism. Turning adversities to opportunities and or immediate-adaptive responsiveness in emergency situations has been one of his much-appreciated forte. In his 30 years of journalism conflict-reporting from the ground; street studio as immediate response to the Nepal earthquake 2015 for undisrupted news service and; TOUGHtalk from HOME a daily streaming show including key expertise in multiple Social Media in response to the COVID-19 situation are some of his major career milestones.

Life and career 
Pathak have done Mphil in Mass Communication from Tribhuwan University.
Besides journalism, he has also worked as a film director. In the early 2000s, he made several documentaries, and three of the documentary films he made in 2005 were selected for Himalayan Film Festival of 2005, along with dozen of other films screened in different parts of the world.
Pathak, is the founder of Interface, Nepal- Media for Arts and Rights. He has a track record of producing popular, effective, social change media.  Documentaries like People’s Constitution, The Challenge of Diversity: The Federal Experience and The Constituent Assembly Election: Beginning of a New Era has been milestone production for their historical and archival value, for its quality and content and above all for its overwhelming use as a tool for dialogue in the process of making the constitution. He has proven record of producing documentaries that has won international awards (Peace Song) and films screened in many national and international forums around the globe. He has also worked with internationally acclaimed film-makers like the French Diretcor Regis Wargnier (Let my People go) and Hongkong based media personality like Eric Yeung.

He worked as an editor in chief for News 24 and hosted his show ''Tough Talk.

In 2021 Pathak was honored with Prabal Jana Sewa Shree Padak (प्रबल जनसेवाश्री पदक) by the Nepal Government for his contributions to Nepali media by President Bidhya Devi Bhandari.

References 

Nepalese journalists
Living people
1972 births